N-World is a 3D graphics package developed by Nichimen Graphics in the 1990s, for Silicon Graphics and Windows NT workstations. Intended primarily for video game content creation, it has polygon modeling tools, 2D and 3D paint, scripting, color reduction, and exporters for several popular game consoles.

After its initial release on Windows NT, N-World was renamed  Mirai. The winged edge 3D modeler in N-World inspired the development at Nichimen Graphics of Nendo, a standalone 3D modeler, which in turn inspired the open source modeler Wings 3D.

History
N-World originated with Symbolics, a computer manufacturer notable for producing Lisp-based systems in the 1980s. Among the software packages that were produced for Symbolics computers are S-Graphics, a 3D animation suite that includes modules for polygon modeling, dynamics, paint, and rendering — titled S-Geometry, S-Dynamics, S-Paint, and S-Render, respectively. In 1992, Japanese trading company Nichimen Corporation purchased the rights to S-Graphics, ported it to Silicon Graphics IRIX, and marketed it as N-World.

N-World retains the Lisp-based underpinnings of its predecessor, but was targeted at interactive content producers, with features useful for game developers.

N-World was used to create graphics for many console games in the 1990s, including Super Mario 64 and Final Fantasy VII. It was superseded by Mirai in 1999.

Features

The N-World package, like its predecessor S-Graphics, is divided into several components:

 N-Geometry: 3D polygon-based modeling tools, including smoothing, "magnet" geometry editing, and instancing.
 N-Dynamics: Animation tools including scripting, curve-based animation, and skeletal animation.
 N-Render: Surfacing and rendering tools with ray tracing and materials output to various game console formats.
 N-Paint: 2D and 3D paint with mattes, effects, color reduction, and a visual VRAM editor for PlayStation.
 Game Tools: Utilities for game developers, including exporters for PlayStation, Nintendo 64, and Saturn consoles.

Credits
The following games were created using N-World.

 Super Mario 64
 Final Fantasy VII
 Gran Turismo
 Bomberman 64
 Magic the Gathering
 NBA Jam Extreme
 NHL Breakaway
 PaRappa the Rapper
 MediEvil
 WWF '98
 Derby Stallion (PS1)
 Shin Kaitei Gunkan
 AeroGauge
 Virtual ProWrestling
 Power Ranger Pin Ball
 Spider
 Motor Toon Grand Prix
 Beast Wars: Transformers
 Overblood
 Enemy Zero
 Forsaken
 64 Ōzumō
 Crash Bandicoot

  Rap Stars Online

References

External links 
 Nichimen Graphics N-World 3 discussion thread on Nekochan.net

3D graphics software
IRIX software
1990 software
Graphics software
Common Lisp (programming language) software